The Trial of Christine Keeler is a British television series based on the chain of events surrounding the Profumo affair in the 1960s. The six-part series premiered on BBC One in the United Kingdom on 29 December 2019. The series was adapted by screenwriter Amanda Coe and stars Sophie Cookson, James Norton, Ellie Bamber, Ben Miles, Visar Vishka, Emilia Fox, Nathan Stewart-Jarrett and Anthony Welsh.

Premise
Christine Keeler, an English model and a showgirl, becomes entangled in a scandal at age 21, after a series of events involving her two ex-boyfriends Johnny Edgecombe and Lucky Gordon, in combination with MI5's secret service intrigues. These combine to reveal publicly two of Keeler's affairs from two years before when she was 19. Both affairs were with prominent married men - Soviet Union naval attaché Yevgeny Ivanov, and Secretary of State for War, John Profumo, at the height of the Cold War.

Cast

Main cast
 Sophie Cookson as Christine Keeler
 James Norton as Dr. Stephen Ward, an osteopath who introduces Profumo to Keeler.
 Ellie Bamber as Mandy Rice-Davies, model, showgirl and friend of Keeler.
 Ben Miles as John Profumo, a Conservative MP and Secretary of State for War who is plunged into a scandal after his affair with Keeler is exposed.
 Emilia Fox as Valerie Hobson, the actress wife of Profumo.

Recurring and guest cast
 Nathan Stewart-Jarrett as Johnny Edgecombe, a jazz promoter whose involvement with Keeler inadvertently alerted authorities to the Profumo affair.
 Anthony Welsh as Lucky Gordon, a jazz singer who comes to public attention due to his involvement with Keeler.
 Visar Vishka as Eugene Ivanov, Soviet naval attaché having sex with Keeler at the same time she was seeing Profumo.
 Jonny Coyne as Peter Rachman, a notorious landlord who maintained Rice-Davies as his mistress until his sudden death from a heart attack. Keeler had also previously been his mistress.
 Neran Persaud as Emil Savundra, a notorious swindler treated by Ward and who met Keeler and Rice-Davies.
 Amanda Drew as Julie Ellen Payne, Keeler's mother.
 Tim McInnerny as Martin Redmayne MP, the Chief Whip of the ruling Conservative Party.
 Michael Maloney as Viscount Astor, with whom Rice-Davies claimed in court to have had sexual intercourse.
 Anton Lesser as Michael Eddowes, a lawyer who was a close friend of Ward.
 Aidan McArdle as Roger Hollis, the Director General of MI5 from 1956–1965.
 Peter Davison as James Burge, Ward's defence barrister.
 Alex Macqueen as Mervyn Griffith-Jones, the barrister for the prosecution in Ward's trial.
 Paul Jesson as Judge Marshall, the presiding judge at Ward's trial.
 Paul Ritter as Jeremy Hutchinson, Keeler's defence barrister.
 Neil Morrissey as Colin Keeler, Keeler's estranged father.
 Danny Webb as George Wigg, a prominent opposition Labour politician.
 William Gaminara as Sir John Hobson QC MP, the Attorney General.
 Buffy Davis as Barbara Castle MP, a prominent opposition Labour politician.

Production

Development
The Trial of Christine Keeler was announced as a project by the BBC in October 2017, with Amanda Coe attached to script. At the time, Coe stated, "I’m excited to have the opportunity to bring a fresh lens to a story that has become a powerful fable of our national identity. The astonishing story of Christine Keeler and the so-called Profumo affair is the Salem Witch Trial meets O.J. Simpson – a perfect storm of gender, class, race and power that resonates into the world we’re living in today."

Filming
Filming began in Bristol in December 2018. Filming was also spotted on Lansdown Terrace Lane, Cheltenham, Gloucestershire. Abbey Green and North Parade Buildings in Bath can also be seen in episode 1.

Episodes

Release
Keshet International handled the distribution rights internationally, with Endeavor Content in the United States.

Reception
The show received generally positive reviews. 
 Writing in Radio Times, Paul Kirkley gave the show 4 out of 5 stars, saying: "In an age where politicians appear increasingly bulletproof in the face of scandal, there was a danger that The Trial of Christine Keeler’s sexual and political shenanigans might look tame in comparison. But there’s something about the characters in this particular drama that, [...] makes the story as compelling today as it was to the people following every twist and turn in the headlines six decades ago." Lucy Mangan of The Guardian also gave the show 4 out of 5 stars, writing: "The Trial [...] remains a furiously fast, fun ride which doesn’t let the deeper, darker issues fall from its grasp." However, Peter Crawley ends his review in The Irish Times with: "Keeler, who we see at one point playing around with a handgun in her knickers, is more armed and dangerous than just a pretty, vapid bystander, we are meant to understand. But when we later see a tabloid headline that helped thrust her into public consciousness with the words, “Model in Shooting Drama”, you have to wonder, amid all the glam and gloss that surrounds her, how much deeper is the series?"

References

External links 
 
 

Television shows set in London
Adultery in television
Cultural depictions of John Profumo
Cultural depictions of Christine Keeler
Television series set in the 1960s
2010s British television miniseries
2020s British television miniseries
English-language television shows
2019 British television series debuts
2020 British television series endings
2010s British crime drama television series
2020s British crime drama television series
BBC high definition shows
BBC television dramas